Dublin Castle is a former Motte-and-bailey castle and current Irish government complex and conference centre. It was chosen for its position at the highest point of central Dublin.

Until 1922 it was the seat of the British government's administration in Ireland. Much of the current buildings date from the 18th century, though a castle has stood on the site since the days of King John, the first Lord of Ireland. The Castle served as the seat of English, then later British, government of Ireland under the Lordship of Ireland (1171–1541), the Kingdom of Ireland (1541–1800), and the United Kingdom of Great Britain and Ireland (1800–1922).

After the signing of the Anglo-Irish Treaty in December 1921, the complex was ceremonially handed over to the newly formed Provisional Government led by Michael Collins. It now hosts the inauguration of each President of Ireland and various State receptions.

The castle was built by the dark pool ("Dubh Linn") which gave Dublin its name. This pool lies on the lower course of the River Poddle before its confluence with the River Liffey; when the castle was built, the Liffey was much wider, and the castle was effectively defended by both rivers. The Poddle today runs under the complex.

Roles

Dublin Castle has fulfilled a number of roles throughout its history. Originally built as a defensive fortification for the Norman city of Dublin, it later evolved into an official residence, used by the Lord Lieutenant of Ireland or Viceroy of Ireland, the representative of the Monarch. The second-in-command in the Dublin Castle administration, the Chief Secretary for Ireland, also had his offices there. Over the years parliament and certain law courts met at the castle before moving to new purpose-built venues. It also served as the base for a military garrison and later also intelligence services.

Upon the formation of the Irish Free State in December 1922, the castle temporarily assumed the role of the Four Courts, the legal complex badly damaged during the Civil War; this arrangement would last for a decade.

It was decided in 1938 that the inauguration of the first President of Ireland, Douglas Hyde, would take place in the castle, and the complex has been host to this ceremony ever since. The castle is also used for hosting official State visits as well as more informal foreign affairs engagements, State banquets, including that for the visit of Queen Elizabeth II in 2011, and Government policy launches.  It also acts as the central base for Ireland's hosting of the European Presidency, approximately every 10 years. Two dedicated conference facilities, The Hibernia Conference Centre and The Printworks were installed for the European Presidencies of 1990 and 2013, and are made available for rental by the private sector too.

The castle's State Apartments and their associated collection of historic materials form an accredited museum, and the castle complex is also home to a Garda Síochána unit and the Garda Museum, some parts of the Office of Public Works, some functions of the Irish Revenue Commissioners – and the Revenue Museum – and the Chester Beatty Library.

History

Dublin Castle was first founded as a major defensive work by Meiler Fitzhenry on the orders of King John of England in 1204, sometime after the Norman invasion of Ireland in 1169, when it was commanded that a castle be built with strong walls and good ditches for the defence of the city, the administration of justice, and the protection of the King's treasure. Largely complete by 1230, the castle was of typical Norman courtyard design, with a central square without a keep, bounded on all sides by tall defensive walls and protected at each corner by a circular tower. Sited to the southeast of Norman Dublin, the castle formed one corner of the outer perimeter of the city, using the River Poddle as a natural means of defence along two of its sides. The city wall directly abutted the castle's northeast Powder Tower, extending north and westwards around the city before rejoining the castle at its southwestern Bermingham Tower. In 1620 the English-born judge Luke Gernon was greatly impressed by the wall: "a huge and mighty wall, foursquare, and of incredible thickness". In the 17th century, the Earl of Arran described the Castle as "the worst castle in the worst situation in Christendom".

The Poddle was diverted into the city through archways where the walls adjoined the castle, artificially flooding the moat of the fortress's city elevations. One of these archways and part of the wall survive buried underneath the 18th-century buildings, and are open for public viewing.

Through the Middle Ages the wooden buildings within the castle square evolved and changed, the most significant addition being the Great Hall built of stone and timber, variously used as Parliament house, court of law and banqueting hall. The building survived until 1673, when it was damaged by fire and demolished shortly afterwards. The Court of Castle Chamber, the Irish counterpart to the English Star Chamber, sat in Dublin Castle in a room which was specially built for it about 1570. The Castle sustained severe fire damage in 1684. Extensive rebuilding transformed it from a medieval fortress to a Georgian palace. No trace of medieval buildings remains above ground level today, with the exception of the great Record Tower (ca. 1228–1230); it is the sole surviving tower of the original fortification, its battlements an early 19th-century addition.

United Irishmen General Joseph Holt, a participant in the 1798 Rising, was incarcerated in the Bermingham Tower before being transported to New South Wales in 1799.

In 1884 officers at the Castle were at the centre of a sensational homosexual scandal incited by the Irish Nationalist politician William O'Brien through his newspaper United Ireland.

In 1907 the Irish Crown Jewels were stolen from the Castle. Suspicion fell upon the Officer of Arms, Sir Arthur Vicars, but rumours of his homosexuality and links to socially important gay men in London, may have compromised the investigation. The jewels have never been recovered.

At the very beginning of the Easter Rising of 1916, a force of twenty-five Irish Citizen Army members were able to seize the entrance and guard room of the Castle before reinforcements for the small garrison arrived. During the Anglo-Irish War the Castle was the nerve centre of the British effort against Irish separatism. On the night of Bloody Sunday in 1920, three Irish Republican Army members Dick McKee, Conor Clune and Peadar Clancy, were tortured and killed there.

When the Irish Free State came into being in 1922, Dublin Castle ceased to function as the administrative seat. It served for some years as temporary Courts of Justice (the Four Courts, the home of the Irish courts' system, had been destroyed in 1922). After the courts vacated the premises, the Castle was used for state ceremonies. As President of the Executive Council, Éamon de Valera received credentials there from newly arrived ambassadors to Ireland on behalf of King George V in the 1930s. In 1938, Douglas Hyde was inaugurated as President of Ireland at the Castle. All inaugurations of subsequent presidents have taken place there since. President Erskine Hamilton Childers' lying-in-state took place there in November 1974, as did that of former President Éamon de Valera in September 1975.

Buildings and architecture

State Apartments
The State Apartments, located in the southern range of buildings of the Upper Yard, contain the rooms formerly used by the Lord Lieutenant for personal accommodation and public entertaining during the Castle Season. Today these richly decorated rooms are used by the Irish government for official engagements including policy launches, hosting of State Visit ceremonial, and the inauguration of the President every seven years. The apartments and their collections form an accredited museum.

The principal rooms of the state apartment complex include:

Saint Patrick's Hall

This is the grandest room of the state apartments, and contains one of the most important decorative interiors in Ireland. Formerly the ballroom of the Lord Lieutenant's administration, today the room is used for presidential inaugurations. If a President of Ireland dies in office, such as Erskine H. Childers in 1974, it is here that he or she lies in state. It is one of the oldest rooms in the castle, dating from the 1740s, though its decoration largely dates from c. 1790, including the most significant painted ceiling in Ireland, executed by Vincenzo Valdre (c. 1742–1814). Composed of three panels, the ceiling depicts the coronation of King George III, Saint Patrick introducing Christianity to Ireland, and King Henry II receiving the submission of the Irish chieftains. The state dinner hosted by the President of Ireland to welcome Queen Elizabeth II to the Republic of Ireland was held here on the evening of 18 May 2011.

Following the disestablishment of the Church of Ireland in 1871, the Order of St. Patrick, Ireland's order of chivalry, moved its ceremonial home from St. Patrick's Cathedral to St. Patrick's Hall. The banners and hatchment plates of the knights who were living at the time when most of Ireland gained a form of independence as the Irish Free State, in December 1922, remain in place.

Throne Room
Originally built as the Battleaxe Hall in the 1740s, it was converted to a presence chamber around 1790. The regal decoration dates from that time and from alterations in the 1830s. It contains a throne built for the visit of King George IV to Ireland in 1821.

State Drawing Room
Remodelled in the 1830s as the principal reception room of the Lord Lieutenant and his household, today this room is reserved in use for the reception of foreign dignitaries. Largely destroyed by fire in 1941, the room was reconstructed with minor modifications in 1964–1968 by the OPW, making use of salvaged and replicated furnishings and fittings.

State Dining Room
Also called the Picture Gallery, and formerly known as the Supper Room, this is the oldest room in the castle and largely retains its original decoration, having escaped major modification and fire over the years. It dates from Lord Chesterfield's building of the State Apartments in the 1740s, and was intended for use as a supper room adjoining St. Patrick's Hall and as a personal dining room. Today the room is still used for dining when conferences take place in St. Patrick's Hall.

State bedrooms
These former private quarters of the Lord Lieutenant were built as five interconnecting rooms running along the back of the building, adjoining the spine corridor that separates them from the state drawing room. Completely rebuilt in the 1960s following a fire in 1941, the rooms maintain the original courtly sequence and today are used as ancillary drawing and meeting rooms to the principal apartments. The last dignitary to stay in the royal bedrooms was Prime Minister Margaret Thatcher, who spent a night there with her husband Denis during one of the European Council meetings held in the 1980s.

State Corridor
The most architectural space of the State Apartments, this expressive, deeply modelled corridor, was originally built c. 1758 to the designs of the Surveyor General, Thomas Eyre. Based on the early 18th-century corridor of Sir Edward Lovett Pearce in the former Parliament House on College Green, it features a marching procession of vaults and arches which were originally top-lit. Regrettably, an office storey was built over the skylights following complete reconstruction of the corridor in the 1960s as the result of a differential settlement with the reconstruction of the adjoining drawing room. The corridor features exact plaster casts of the original arch detailing, and the original doorcases and fireplaces were salvaged prior to rebuilding.

Towers

The castle includes towers at two corners; other towers that once existed within the complex.

Bermingham Tower
The base of the original Bermingham Tower is one of the few remaining parts of the original castle. At the southwest corner of the castle, the tower has a modern upper part. It is unclear which member of the De Bermingham family the tower was named for; perhaps William or Walter or John or Sir Walter.

Record Tower
The Record Tower at the southeast corner is another original part of the castle. Also known as the Wardrobe Tower, it originally dates from the 1220s. It was restored between 1810 and 1813 by Francis Johnston. It hosted the Garda Museum until its 2017 relaunch in the Treasury Building.

Bedford Tower
Construction of Bedford Tower began in 1750, and was completed in 1761 by Thomas Eyre. The Guard House mirrors it.

Powder Tower
The base of this tower can be seen in the basement of the northeast corner of the lower castle yard. It was also known as the Storehouse Tower and was built around 1228. Its calp walls were 3.7 metres thick, and the internal diameter was 6.1 metres. The base of this tower is still along the flow of the River Poddle. Surviving Viking defences remain under this section of the Castle.

Cork Tower
This tower stood at the northwest corner of the medieval enclosure. The base remains behind the west range of the upper castle yard.

Architecture
John Cornforth described the Castle as "not even a work of architecture" but "a piece of English make-do and mend".

Government offices
The complex houses, among other things, some offices of the Revenue Commissioners, including a Stamping Office in a 20th-century building at the end of the Castle Yard. The modern office block was designed by Frank du Berry, a senior OPW architect, in the late 1960s. The design was denounced by many groups, citing the unsympathetic nature of the four-storey block and the placement, which disrupted the rectangular layout of the Castle. Among the groups that objected were the Irish Georgian Society, An Taisce, and the Royal Institute of the Architects of Ireland. Construction began anyway in 1970.

Some elements of the OPW are based in an old stables area, and some functions of the Garda Síochána are also based at the Castle.

Tourism and culture
The complex of buildings is usually open to the public, except during certain state functions. The crypt of the Chapel Royal is now used as an arts centre, and occasional concerts are held in the grounds of the Castle.

The castle complex also hosts the Chester Beatty Library, in a purpose-constructed facility, with a café, the Garda Museum, in the Treasury Building, and the Revenue Museum.

The former site of the "dark pool" on the Poddle was remodelled into a garden, with a water feature that commemorates fallen Gardaí, and a helipad.

Operation
Dublin Castle is maintained and managed by the Office of Public Works (OPW).

Popular media

Film
Dublin Castle has appeared in numerous films including Barry Lyndon, Michael Collins, Becoming Jane and The Medallion, as well as the television series The Tudors, where it doubles as the Vatican in the pilot.

Festivals
Part of Dublin Castle appears on the cover of the Jandek album Khartoum Variations.

Fiction 
In George Moore's A Drama in Muslin, Dublin Castle appears in a number of chapters as the venue for high society events associated with the Viceroy and the British administration in Dublin.

See also

Castles in Great Britain and Ireland
Chapel Royal
Dublin Castle administration in Ireland
List of castles in Ireland

References

Notes

Sources

Further reading
 Murdoch, Tessa (ed.) (2022). Great Irish Households: Inventories from the Long Eighteenth Century. Cambridge: John Adamson,

External links

Official Tourist Board Website for Dublin
Archiseek.com, entry on Dublin Castle (including pictures)

Castles in Dublin (city)
Norman architecture in Ireland
Royal residences in the Republic of Ireland
Lords Lieutenant of Ireland
Government Houses of the British Empire and Commonwealth
Government buildings in the Republic of Ireland
Museums in Dublin (city)
Historic house museums in the Republic of Ireland
Archaeological sites in County Dublin